The Long Pond River (Barbados) is a river of Barbados.

See also
List of rivers of Barbados

References

Rivers of Barbados